Valerio Checchi (born Subiaco, Lazio, 3 April 1980) is an Italian cross-country skier who has competed since 1999. He has two World Cup victories with one in 2006 and another in 2008.

At the 2006 Winter Olympics in Turin, Checchi finished 18th in the 15 km + 15 km double pursuit event and 36th in the 15 km event. Checchi's best finish at the FIS Nordic World Ski Championships was fourth in the 4 × 10 km relay at Liberec in 2009.

Checchi finished ninth in the 4 × 10 km relay event at the 2010 Winter Olympics in Vancouver, British Columbia, Canada.

Anti-doping rule violation 
Checchi was in 2014 handed a one-year ban from sports for three whereabouts failures in 18 months. The ban ended 13 April 2015.

Cross-country skiing results
All results are sourced from the International Ski Federation (FIS).

Olympic Games

World Championships

World Cup

Season standings

Individual podiums
1 victory – (1 ) 
4 podiums – (2 , 2 )

Team podiums
 1 victory – (1 ) 
 6 podiums – (6 )

References

External links

1980 births
Living people
People from Subiaco, Lazio
Cross-country skiers at the 2006 Winter Olympics
Cross-country skiers at the 2010 Winter Olympics
Doping cases in cross-country skiing
Italian sportspeople in doping cases
Italian male cross-country skiers
Tour de Ski skiers
Olympic cross-country skiers of Italy
Sportspeople from the Metropolitan City of Rome Capital